The BLU-14/B was an American 347 kg (766 lb) ground-penetrating anti-vehicle mine for release by low-flying (down to 11 m (35 ft) altitude) aircraft. It was a derivative of the MLU-10/B  land mine, and therefore essentially identical in shape and weight to the BLU-31/B anti-vehicle demolition mine and bomb. The designation "BLU" stands for Bomb Live Unit, as opposed to "BDU" (Bomb Dummy Units) used for practice.

The BLU-14/B has a low, stable ricochet trajectory that is predictable within close limits. It will penetrate into the ground at an angle that is less than half that required by an M117 bomb. The BLU-14/B and MLU-10/B differ only in regard to their respective fusing.

All three weapons (the BLU-14, MLU-10, and MLU-31) have a blunt flat front end of  thickness.

References

Aerial bombs of the United States
Cold War aerial bombs of the United States
Land mines of the United States